This is a list of musicians and musical groups from the Inland Empire region of California.

 AK Epic (rapper/singer)
Al Wilson
 Alien Ant Farm
 Amy Lee (singer from Evanescence) 
 Audio Push
 Camper Van Beethoven
 Cracker
 Cutthroat Cain 
 DJ Lynnwood
 DJ Trevi
 Eagles of Death Metal
 Face to Face
 Finch
 Frank Zappa
 Impending Doom 
 Joy Electric 
 Kaleidoscope
 Keenwild
 Kottonmouth Kings
 Kyuss
 Letter Kills
 Lighter Shade of Brown
 Lil Xan
 Noa James
 Queens of the Stone Age
 Rufio
 Saint Dog
 Sammy Hagar
 Slayer
 Starflyer 59 
Suga Free (known for being DJ Quik's protege)
 Suicide Silence
 Sweet Comfort Band
 Tajai Katana
 The Bellrays
 The Mountain Goats
 The Unforgiven
 Travis Barker
 Voodoo Glow Skulls
 Winds of Plague
 Yesterdays Rising

See also

 List of bands from Los Angeles
 Palm Desert Scene

Inland Empire
Inland Empire
Inland Empire